Primmer is a surname. Notable people with the surname include:

Cyril Primmer (1924–2003), Australian politician
Wayne Primmer (born 1959), Australian rules footballer

See also
Priemer